Richard Alphonsus Sheehan was an Irish priest and historian who served as Roman Catholic Bishop of Waterford and Lismore from 1892 until his death in 1915.	

Born in Bantry Co. Cork, on June 16, 1845. He was educated at Bandon national school and St Vincent's, Cork. He entered Maynooth College in 1860 and was ordained in 1868 for the diocese of Cork.

Sheehan served as president of the Cork Historical and Archaeological Society, since its foundation in 1891 until 1893.

Sheehan was appointed Bishop of Waterford and Lismore on 15 January 1892 and consecrated on 31 January 1892. 

Sheehan, died on 14 August 1915.

References

1845 births
1915 deaths
Roman Catholic bishops of Waterford and Lismore
People from County Cork
Alumni of St Patrick's College, Maynooth